Statistics of Swiss Super League in the 1971–72 season.

Overview
14 teams contested in the 1971–72 Nationalliga A. These were the top 12 teams from the previous 1970–71 season and the two newly promoted teams St. Gallen and Grenchen. The championship was played in a double round robin. The champions would qualify for the 1972–73 European Cup and the last two teams in the table at the end of the season were to be relegated. Basel remained undefeated in the league during the first 24 rounds. Of their 26 league games Basel won 18, drawing seven, losing just once, scoring 66 goals conceding 28. Basel won the championship four points ahead of Zürich and five points ahead of the Grasshoppers. Zürich were Swiss Cup winners and qualified for 1972–73 Cup Winners' Cup. Grasshopper Club and Lausanne-Sport qualified for 1972–73 UEFA Cup. Luzern and Biel-Bienne suffered relegation.

League standings

Results

References

Sources
Switzerland 1971–72 at RSSSF

Swiss Football League seasons
Swiss
1971–72 in Swiss football